Clark (also Chris Clark) is an electronic musician.  His discography includes twelve LPs, and nine EPs.

As Chris Clark

LPs
 Clarence Park, Warp Records April 2001
 Empty the Bones of You, Warp Records September 2003

EPs
 Ceramics Is the Bomb Warp Records May 2003

As Clark

LPs
 Body Riddle, Warp Records October 2006
 Turning Dragon, Warp Records March 2008
 Totems Flare, Warp Records July 2009
 Iradelphic, Warp Records April 2012
 Feast / Beast, Warp Records September 2013
 Clark, Warp Records November 2014
 The Last Panthers, Warp Records March 2016 
Death Peak, Warp Records April 2017
Kiri Variations, Throttle Records July 2019
Daniel Isn't Real, Deutsche Grammophon December 2019. re-released as Daniel Isn't Real (Expanded Edition) in 2020
Playground in a Lake, Deutsche Grammophon March 2021.
05-10, Throttle Records, Warp Records September 2022.A compilation of new tracks, unreleased archive material and rarities, collected by Clark to release alongside the remastered reissue of the Body Riddle album

EPs
 Throttle Furniture Warp Records February 2006
 Throttle Clarence Warp Records October 2006. It was shipped with copies of Body Riddle that were ordered from Warpmart (now Bleep.com)
 Ted E.P. Warp Records March 2007
 Throttle Promoter Warp Records December 2007
 Growls Garden Warp Records March 2009
Willenhall / Baskerville Grinch Warp Records April 2011. This was a split 12" from Bibio and Clark, Clark's track being Baskerville Grinch.
 Fantasm Planes Warp Records September 2012. A counterpart release to Iradelphic.
Superscope, Warp Records March 2014.
Edits, Warp Records December 2014. 
Flame Rave, Warp Records March 2015.
Bobbie Caris, Warp Records May 2017.
Rellik EP, Warp Records September 2017.
Honey Badger / Pig, Warp Records October 2017.
E.C.S.T T.R.A.X, Throttle Records September 2018.
Branding Problem, Throttle Records November 2019.
Suspension Reservoir (Air Version), Deutsche Grammophon June 2014.

Remixes

Ra-x - "Hammersmashed" (Angelmaker Records 2005) (As Chris Clark)
Friendly Fires - "Bring Out Your Dead" (People in the Sky 2007)
Milanese - "Mr Bad News" (Planet Mu 2007)
Amon Tobin - "Kitchen Sink" (Ninja tune November 2007)
Dextro - "Hearts & Minds" (Grönland Records May 2007)
Yila featuring Scroobius Pip - "Astronaut" (Sunday Best Recordings February 2008)
Pivot - "Sweet Memory" (Warp Records May 2008)
Paral-lel - "Till the Day Falls" (Barely Breaking Even November 2008)
Bibio - "S'vive" (Warp Records November 2009)
Maxïmo Park - "Let's Get Clinical" (Warp Records November 2009)
Health (band) - "Die Slow" (City Slang April 2010)
Massive Attack - "Redlight" (Virgin Records January 2011)
DM Stith - "Braid of Voices" (Asthmatic Kitty 2010)
Silverman - "Can't Stand the Rain" (One 4 Ho September 2007)
Aufgang - "Dulceria" (InFiné October 2010)
Depeche Mode - "Freestate" (Mute Records June 2011)
Kuedo - "Glow" (Planet Mu June 2011)
Letherette - D&T (Ninja Tune April 2013)
Nils Frahm - "Peter" (Erased Tapes Records 2013)
Rone Featuring High Priest - "Let's Go" (InFiné June 2013)

Contributions to other releases
 Warp20 (Recreated) Warp Records 2009. Clark contributed a cover of the Milanese song So Malleable.

References

External links

 
 

Discographies of British artists
Electronic music discographies
Production discographies